"Secretly" is a song by Skunk Anansie and the second single from their third studio album, Post Orgasmic Chill (1999). It was released on 10 May 1999. CD1 comes with an interactive element featuring the video. The song was played during the closing credits to the film Cruel Intentions and is included on the film's soundtrack album. The video for the single drew heavily on the film. It charted at number 16 on the UK Singles Chart, number eight in Italy, and number two in Iceland.

Music video
The music video was directed by Giuseppe Capotondi.

Track listing
CD single 1

CD single 2

Charts

Weekly charts

Year-end charts

References

1999 singles
Skunk Anansie songs
Rock ballads
1999 songs
Virgin Records singles
Songs written by Skin (musician)
Songs written by Len Arran
Music videos directed by Giuseppe Capotondi